Charles K. Barton (August 16, 1886 – January 25, 1958) was an American politician who served in the New Jersey Senate from 1943 to 1948.

References

1886 births
1958 deaths
Majority leaders of the New Jersey Senate
Republican Party New Jersey state senators
Politicians from Paterson, New Jersey
Presidents of the New Jersey Senate
20th-century American politicians